Scleromitrion diffusum, synonyms including Hedyotis diffusa, is a species of flowering plant in the family Rubiaceae. It is sometimes combined with Siraitia grosvenorii and Scutellaria barbata to make hot drinks like lohoguo of guongsei or luohanguo pearl and sheshecao beverage.

Taxonomy
There is considerable confusion over the application of the name Hedyotis diffusa Willd. and its synonyms. In the sense used in the Flora of China, and in much research on the phytochemistry, pharmacology and potential medical applications of the species, Hedyotis diffusa refers to a plant with solitary-flowered (or at most two- or three-flowered) inflorescences. In 1990, a herbarium specimen of a plant with different form of inflorescence was chosen as the lectotype. In 2021, it was proposed that the name Hedyotis diffusa should be conserved, based on a one-flowered specimen as the type. Synonyms of Hedyotis diffusa then include Oldenlandia diffusa (Willd.) Roxb. and Scleromitrion diffusum (Willd.) R.J.Wang. These are the homotypic synonyms accepted by Plants of the World Online , which treated the taxon as Scleromitrion diffusum.

Distribution
Wild Scleromitrion diffusum is native to tropical and subtropical Asia.

References

Spermacoceae
Flora of Asia
Plants described in 1798
Plants used in traditional Chinese medicine